Mr. Stranger's Sealed Packet is a short novel by Hugh MacColl. It was first published in English in 1889. This novel is now out of print.

The novel deals with a journey to Mars in a flying machine and describes the history and customs of the Martians, depicting a scientifically advanced utopian society.

External links
Contemporary review from Nature: A Weekly Illustrated Journal of Science Volume 40 July 25, 1889

1889 British novels
1889 science fiction novels
British science fiction novels
Space exploration novels
Novels set on Mars